Sparna is a genus of longhorn beetles of the tribe Colobotheini.

Accepted species:
 Sparna bosqi Gilmour, 1954
 Sparna colombiana Gilmour, 1950
 Sparna lycoides Thomson, 1864
 Sparna macilenta Pascoe, 1888
 Sparna migsominea Gilmour, 1950
 Sparna nigrolineata Fuchs, 1956
 Sparna pallida Gilmour, 1950
 Sparna platyptera Bates, 1881

References

Colobotheini